Nathan is a masculine given name and it's a short form of Jonathan. It is derived from the Hebrew verb  meaning gave (standard Hebrew Natan, Yiddish Nussen/Nosson, Tiberian Hebrew Nāṯān). The meaning of the name in Jewish culture could be rendered "he has given" "gift from God"

In the Bible
Nathan (prophet), a prophet who lived in the time of Kings David and Solomon
Nathan (son of David), son of David and his wife Bathsheba

Notable people with this name
 Rabbi Nathan (disambiguation), multiple people
 Nathan of Gaza, 17th century prophet

A
 Nathan Adams (born 1991), footballer
 Nathan Adrian (born 1988), American swimmer
 Nathan Aké (born 1995), footballer currently playing for Manchester City
 Nathan Alterman (1910–70), Israeli poet, journalist, and translator
 Nathan Amos (born 1979), South African born-Israeli rugby player
 Nathan Azarcon Filipino bass player and nationalist

B
 Nathan Beauregard (1890s–1970), American musician
 Nathan Birnbaum (1864–1937), Austrian journalist and Jewish philosopher
 Nathan Bostock (born 1960), British banker
 Nathan Brown (rugby league, born 1993), Australian rugby player

C
 Nathan Carter (born 1990), Irish country singer
 Nathan Chen (born 1999), American figure skater
 Nate Clements (born 1979), American football player
 Nathan Coe (born 1984), Australian soccer player
 Nathan Cohen (critic) (1923-1971), Canadian theatre critic and broadcaster
 Nathan Cohen (rower) (born 1986), New Zealand rower
 Nathan Daniel Beau Connolly (born 1977), American historian, professor, and podcaster
 Nathan Connolly (born 1981), lead guitarist for Snow Patrol
 Nathan Cooper (disambiguation), multiple people
 Nathan Cottrell (born 1996), American football player

D
 Nathan Deal (born 1942), American politician and 82nd Governor of Georgia
 Nate Diaz (born 1985), American mixed martial artist and UFC fighter

E
 Nate Ebner (born 1988), American football player and rugby Olympian

F
 Nathan Fagan-Gayle (born 1986), British musician known as Nathan
 Nathan Feuerstein (born 1991), American rapper, known by his stage name NF
 Nathan Fielder (born 1983), Canadian comedian and host of Comedy Central series Nathan For You.
 Nathan Fillion (born 1971), Canadian actor
 Nathan Fong (1959-2020), Canadian chef
 Nathan Bedford Forrest (1821–1877), Civil War general in the Confederate Army
 Nate Freiman (born 1986), American baseball player

G
 Nathan Gamble (born 1998), American actor
 Nathan Gerry (born 1995), American football player
 Nathan Glantz, American jazz bandleader
 Nathan Goff, Jr. (1843–1920), US Congressman from West Virginia

H
 Nathan Hale (1755–1776), American patriot serving as a spy during the American Revolution
 Nathan Handwerker (1891–1974), Polish-American businessman
 Nathan Hartono (born 1991), Singaporean-Indonesian singer-songwriter
 Nathan Hauritz (born 1981), Australian cricketer
 Nathan Head (born 1980), British actor notable for his work in the horror genre

J
 Nate James (disambiguation), multiple people
 Nathan Jawai (born 1986), Australian basketball player
 Nathan Johnson (disambiguation), several people
 Nathan Leigh Jones, Australian musician and speaker
 Nathan Jonas "Joey" Jordison (1975-2021), American drummer for the band Slipknot
 Nathan Jung (1946–2021), American actor and stuntman

K
 Nathan King (disambiguation), multiple people
 Nathan Kress (born 1992), American actor

L
 Nathan Lane (born 1956), American actor
 Nathan Larson (born 1970), American guitarist, singer, songwriter, and author
 Nathan Law (born 1993), Hong Kong politician
 Nathan Lawrence, American actor
 Nathan Lawson (ice hockey) (born 1983), Canadian ice hockey player
 Nathan Lyon (born 1987), Australian cricketer
 Nathan Lyons (1930–2016), American photographer, curator and educator

M
 Nate Mack (1891–1965), Polish-born American banker; co-founder of the Bank of Las Vegas
 Nathan MacKinnon (born 1995), Canadian ice hockey player
 Nathan Mavila (born 1995), English footballer
 Nathan McCall (born 1955), American author
 Nate McLouth (born 1981), American baseball player
 Nathan Mensah (born 1998), Ghanaian basketball player
 Nathan Merritt (born 1982), Australian rugby player
 Nathan Militzok (1923–2009), American basketball player
 Nathan Milstein (1903–1992), Ukrainian-American violinist

P
 Nathan Peats (born 1990), Australian rugby player
 Nathan Perkovich (born 1985), American professional ice hockey player
 Nathan Peterman (born 1994), American football player
 Nathan Post (1881–1938), 7th and 10th Governor of American Samoa

R
 Nathan Rosen (1909-1995), American-Israeli theoretical physicist; originator of the concept of Einstein-Rosen Bridges, also known as wormholes
 Nathan Mayer Rothschild (1777–1836), German Jewish banker

S
 Nate Saint (1923–1956), American missionary pilot
 Nathan Seiberg (born 1956), Israeli theoretical physicist
 Nathan Shepherd (American football) (born 1993), Canadian-American football player
 Nate Silver (born 1978), American statistician and writer
 Nathan Smith (disambiguation), multiple people
 Nathan Stewart-Jarrett (born 1985), British actor
 Nathan Sykes (born 1974), English rugby player
 Nathan James Sykes (born 1993), English singer, songwriter and record producer

T
Nate Teut (born 1976), Former Major League pitcher for Florida Marlins
Nathan Trupp (born 1947), American serial killer

Z
 Nathan Zach (1930–2020), Israeli poet

Fictional characters
 Nathan the Wise, eponymous protagonist in the 1779 play by Gotthold Ephraim Lessing
 Big Nate, eponymous comic strip character
 Nate the Great, eponymous protagonist of the book series by Marjorie W. Sharmat
 Nathan, a customer played by Andrew Black in the British web series Corner Shop Show.
 Nathan Bailey, a character in the British soap opera, Doctors
 Nathan Cuddington, a character in the British Soap opera, Brookside
 Nathan Detroit, from the stage musical Guys and Dolls, played by Frank Sinatra in the film adaptation.
 Nathan Drake, protagonist of the Uncharted video games
 Nathan Explosion, a character in the cartoon series Metalocalypse
 Nathan Never, eponymous protagonist of the Italian science fiction comic book
 Nathan Petrelli, a character in the NBC science fiction series Heroes
 Nathan Prescott, antagonist of the Life Is Strange video games
 Nathan Roberts, a character in the Australian soap opera, Home and Away
 Nathan Sallery, a character in the British soap opera Doctors
 Nathan Scott, a character in the television series One Tree Hill
 Nathan Sears, a character in the Final Destination 5
 Nathan Stark, a character in the television series Eureka
 Nathan Summers, a Marvel Comic Book character who a mutant and Super-Hero from the X-Men and X-Force
 Nathan Williams, a character in the British Soap opera EastEnders
 Nathan Young character from the British Channel 4 science fiction comedy-drama Misfits
 Nathan Zuckerman, narrator or protagonist in many of Philip Roth's works of fiction

See also
Nathan (disambiguation)
Nathan (surname)
Natan, a given name and surname
Nate (given name)
Jonathan (name)
Nathaniel
All pages beginning with Nathan

References

Hebrew-language names
English masculine given names
Masculine given names